Birgitte Hanel (born 25 April 1954 in Jægersborg) is a Danish rower.

References 
 
 

1954 births
Living people
Danish female rowers
People from Gentofte Municipality
Rowers at the 1984 Summer Olympics
Olympic bronze medalists for Denmark
Olympic rowers of Denmark
Medalists at the 1984 Summer Olympics
Olympic medalists in rowing
Sportspeople from the Capital Region of Denmark